"Almost in Love" is a song recorded by Elvis Presley as part of the soundtrack for his 1968 motion picture Live a Little, Love a Little. Luiz Bonfa had previously released an instrumental version of this tune in 1966 called "Moonlight in Rio".

In September 1968 it was released on a single with the song "A Little Less Conversation" on the other side. Its first LP release was as the title track of Presley's budget album Almost in Love in November 1970.

On December 1, 1970, the single "Almost in Love" / "A Little Less Conversation" was re-released as part of RCA Victor's Gold Standard Series (together with 9 other Presley's singles).

Writing 
The song is credited to Luiz Bonfá and Randy Starr.

Recording 
Presley recorded it on March 7, 1968.

Track listings 
7" single (RCA Victor 49.569, 29 November 1968)
 Almost In Love (3:00)
 A Little Less Conversation (2:00)

Charts

References

External links 
 Elvis Presley with The Jordanaires – Almost in Love / A Little Less Conversation at Discogs

1968 songs
1968 singles
Elvis Presley songs
RCA Victor singles
Songs with music by Luiz Bonfá
Songs written by Randy Starr
Songs written for films